Nelis is a Dutch masculine given name, a short form of the given name Cornelis, and a patronymic surname derived from it. Notable people with this name include:

Given name
Nelis van Dijk (1904–1969), Dutch boxer
Surname
Manke Nelis ("Limping Nelis") (1919–1993), stage name of one-legged Dutch singer Cornelis Pieters
André Nelis (1935–2012),  Belgian sailor and Olympian
 (1736–1798), Flemish statesman; Bishop of Antwerp 1785–98, brother of Jan Karel
 (1925–1993), Estonian fencer
 (1886–1929), Belgian aviation pioneer
 (1748–1834), Flemish noble, lawyer, and pomologist, brother of Cornelius
Named for him: Winter Nelis pear, a pear he cultivated
Joseph Nelis (1917–1994), Belgian football striker
Mary Nelis (1998–2004), Member of the Northern Ireland Assembly

See also
Nelissen, patronymic surname
Nellis

References

Dutch masculine given names
Dutch-language surnames
Patronymic surnames